Adult Film is the second solo studio album by Tim Kasher of the bands Cursive and The Good Life, released on October 8, 2013 on Saddle Creek Records.

Critical reception 
Adult Film received a "weighted average" score of 69 on music review aggregation site Metacritic, indicating "generally favorable reviews" based on nine publications. Zac Djamoos of AbsolutePunk.net and Ryan J. Prado of Paste praised the album, with Djamoos remarking, "one of the best albums of the year, and arguably his most versatile yet", and Prado commenting on the songwriting complimenting the music, that "His gifts for wrangling emotive detours from unlikely sonic realms is his best talent, but he couldn’t do that without his crafty capacity for language, too." James Christopher Monger of AllMusic found the album to be "patchwork," calling Adult Film "a smorgasbord of pop ephemera, with melodies crashing about like boozy butterflies, occasionally landing on an idea and then leaping back into the blue in search of less restrictive stimuli" and defining this as a major weakness of the album. American Songwriter's Charlie Zaillian shared similar observations, that "There aren’t many hooks to latch onto...no amount of electronic drums, thickly-layered synths, Spanish guitars and theremins can cover a humdrum set of songs."

Track listing 
All songs written by Tim Kasher.

Personnel 
 Tim Kasher - lead vocals, guitar, various instruments
 Sarah Bertuldo - bass, vocals
 Patrick Newbery - organ, keys, synths, horns
 Dylan Ryan - drums

Additional personnel 
 Nate Kinsella - drums
 Laura Stevenson - vocals

References

External links 
 Adult Film on Saddle Creek Records
 Tim Kasher's website

Saddle Creek Records albums
2013 albums
Tim Kasher albums